The 1989 Michigan State Spartans football team represented Michigan State University in the 1989 NCAA Division I-A football season. The Spartans played their home games at Spartan Stadium in East Lansing, Michigan and were coached by George Perles. The team finished the season 8–4 overall and 6–2 in conference play. The Spartans were invited to the 1989 Aloha Bowl where they defeated Hawaii, 33–13. The Spartans were ranked No. 16 in the final AP Poll and Coaches Poll.

The Spartans were coming off a six-win season and a bowl loss in 1988.

Schedule

Personnel

Rankings

Season summary

Miami (OH)

at Notre Dame

Miami (FL)

at Iowa

Michigan

Illinois

at Purdue

Courtney Hawkins set single game school receiving yardage record

at Indiana

Minnesota

Northwestern

at Wisconsin

MSU: Ezor 3 run (Langeloh kick)
MSU: Langeloh 23 FG
WIS: Thompson 36 FG
MSU: Ezor 1 run (Langeloh kick)
MSU: Enos 7 run (Langeloh kick)
MSU: Ezor 56 run (Langeloh kick)
Attendance: 29,776

Rushing: MSU Ezor 30-187; WIS Hunt 7-19
Passing: MSU Enos 7-14-64; WIS Wilson 18-27-202
Receiving: MSU Hawkins 2-23; WIS Miller 7-67

Aloha Bowl (vs. Hawaii)

1990 NFL Draft
The following players were selected in the 1990 NFL Draft.

References

Michigan State
Michigan State Spartans football seasons
Aloha Bowl champion seasons
Michigan State Spartans football